Reflections of a Shadow is the sixth full-length album by the German heavy metal band Rage. It was released in 1990. The album was remastered by Noise/Sanctuary in 2002 with slightly altered cover art, and five bonus tracks, largely taken from the EP Extended Power.

Track listing

Personnel
Band members
Peter "Peavy" Wagner – lead and backing vocals, bass, classical guitar
Manni Schmidt – electric and acoustic guitars, backing vocals
Chris Ephthimiadis – drums

Additional musicians
Ulli Köllner – keyboards, organ, backing vocals

Production
Armin Sabol – producer, mixing at Sky Track Studios, Berlin
Sven Conquest – engineer, mixing
Ralf Krause – mixing
Karl-Ulrich Walterbach – executive producer
Peter Lohde – artwork
John Scarpati – illustration

References

1990 albums
Rage (German band) albums
Noise Records albums